Nana Jadra is a village of Gujarat located near Arabian Sea and 96 km south from district headquarters Bhavnagar.

Nearby Places to visit
Palitana
Bagdana
Kotada
Bhavani mandir

How to reach

School
Nana Jadra P. School
Address : Nana Jadra primary school, Mahuva, Gujarat

College
M.M.Doshi Arts & commers College
Address : Jesar, Mahuva

References 

- Nana Jadra Village 

Villages in Bhavnagar district